The National Liberation Army or ALN was the armed wing of the nationalist National Liberation Front of Algeria during the Algerian War. After Algeria won its independence from France in 1962, the ALN was converted into the regular Algerian People's National Armed Forces.

History

Algerian Revolution

Around two years later this group absorbed most but not all the Algerian nationalist organisations. It then re-organised itself and established a provisional government. This government included five members in executive and legislative bodies; all the members were district heads. During the ongoing war of independence in Algeria; Colonel Houari Boumedienne (the future President of Algeria) led the military wing of the FLN, the National Liberation Army, against the French.

The group grew to nearly 40,000 men in 1957, while France deployed 400,000 soldiers, starting in 1956, in response. The ALN established camps across the borders of Tunisia and Morocco to provide logistical support and arms to their fighters in Algeria. The struggle between the ALN and the French continued until 18 March 1962, when both parties signed a ceasefire in Évian-les-Bains. A referendum, held in Algeria on 1 July as part of the Évian Agreement, led to an overwhelming victory for the separatists, who declared independence two days later.

Post-war

An outraged Arab mob swept into the Pied-Noir neighbourhoods, which had already been largely vacated, and attacked the estimated 40,000 remaining pieds-noirs there. The violence lasted several hours until it was ended by the deployment of French Gendarmerie.

Gallery

References

Bibliography

Algerian War
Arab nationalist militant groups
Paramilitary organisations based in Algeria
Military history of Algeria
National liberation armies
National Liberation Front (Algeria)
Rebel groups in Algeria
Separatism in Algeria
Separatism in France
Left-wing militant groups
1954 establishments in Algeria
1962 disestablishments in Algeria